Mark Otieno Odhiambo (born 11 May 1993) is a Kenyan sprinter. He competed in the men's 100 metres at the 2017 World Championships in Athletics. He tested positive for the banned anabolic steroid Methasterone ahead of the Tokyo Olympic Games and was banned from competing until 2023.

References

External links
 

1993 births
Living people
Kenyan male sprinters
World Athletics Championships athletes for Kenya
People from Kajiado County
Athletes (track and field) at the 2018 Commonwealth Games
Athletes (track and field) at the 2019 African Games
Commonwealth Games competitors for Kenya
African Games competitors for Kenya